Bill White (born June 16, 1953) is an American politician. He served a member of the Missouri House of Representatives from 2011 to 2019, and a member of  the Missouri Senate from 2019 to 2023. He is a member of the Republican Party. White ran for reelection in 2022 for a second term in the Senate, but lost the Republican primary to challenger Jill Carter.

Electoral history

State Representative

State Senate

References

1953 births
21st-century American politicians
Living people
Republican Party members of the Missouri House of Representatives
Republican Party Missouri state senators
Politicians from Joplin, Missouri